Beatriz is a Spanish, Galician and Portuguese female first name. It corresponds to the Latin name Beatrix and the English and Italian name Beatrice.  The name in Latin means 'brings joy' and in other languages also means 'she who brings others happiness'.

Given name
 Infanta Beatriz of Spain (1909–2002), daughter of Spain's King Alfonso XIII and Victoria Eugenie of Battenburg
 Beatriz de Suabia (1203–1235), Queen of Castile and Queen of Leon
 Beatriz de Dia (born c. 1140), the most famous of the trobairitz, female troubadours
 Beatriz Allende (1943–1977), Chilean Socialist politician and revolutionary
 Beatriz Pereira Alvim (1380–1415), first Duchess of Braganza
 Beatriz da Conceição (1939–2015), fadista
 Beatriz Batarda (born 1974), Portuguese actress
 Beatriz Carvajal (born 1949), Spanish actress
 Beatriz Colomina, architecture historian
 Beatriz Corredor (born 1968), Spanish lawyer and politician
 Beatriz Costa (1907–1996), Portuguese actress
 Beatriz Cruz (born 1980), retired track and field athlete
 Beatriz Parra Durango (born 1940), Ecuadorian classical soprano
 Beatriz Enríquez de Arana (1467–1521), the mistress of Christopher Columbus
 Beatriz Fajardo de Mendoza y de Guzmán (1619–1678), Baroness of Polop and Benidorm
 Gigi Fernández (born 1964), former tennis player
 Beatriz Fernández (born 1985), Spanish handball player
 Beatriz Galindo (c. 1465–1534), Spanish physician and educator
 Beatriz Gomes (born 1979), Portuguese sprint canoer
 Beatriz Guido (1924–1988), Argentine novelist and screenwriter
 Beatriz Jaguaribe, Brazilian communications professor and editor
 Beatriz Lucero Lhuillier, Philippine athlete who won Olympic medals in gymnastics and taekwondo
 Beatriz Luengo (born 1982), Spanish actress, singer and dancer
 Beatriz Manchón (born 1976), Spanish sprint canoer
 Beatriz Marinello (born 1964), Chilean-born American chess player
 Beatriz Merino (born 1947), the only female prime minister of Peru
 Beatriz Michelena (1890–1942), American silent film actress
 Beatriz Milhazes (born 1960), Brazilian artist
 Beatriz Azurduy Palacios (1952–2003), Bolivian movie director
 Beatriz Paredes Rangel (born 1953), Mexican politician
 Beatriz Pascual (born 1982), Spanish race walker
 Beatriz Canedo Patiño, Bolivian fashion designer
 Beatriz Peschard, Mexican architect 
 Beatriz Sarlo (born 1942), Argentine literary and cultural critic
 Beatriz Saw (born 1985), one of the season 2 Pinoy Big Brother housemates
 Beatriz Segall (1926–2018), Brazilian actress
 Beatriz Segura (born 1975), Spanish actress
 Beatriz Sheridan (1934–2006), Mexican actress and director
 Ana Martín (born 1947), Mexican actress born Beatriz Solorzano
 Beatriz Stix-Brunell (born 1993), American ballet dancer
 Beatriz Villacañas (born 1964), poet, essayist and literary critic
 Dona Beatriz (1684–1706), Congolese prophet known as Kimpa Vita
 Beatriz Zavala (born 1957), Mexican politician

Fictional characters
 Beatriz DaCosta, a DC Comics superhero with the alternate identities Green Fury and Green Flame
 Beatriz Aurora Pinzón Solano, the title character of the Colombian telenovela Yo soy Betty, la fea
 Beatriz Garcia, aka Penny Century, a fictional character in the comic book series Love and Rockets, by Los Bros Hernandez

See also
 Beatrice (disambiguation)
 Beatrix (disambiguation)
 Beatriz (disambiguation)
 Beata

References

Portuguese feminine given names
Spanish feminine given names